Sudhakar Singh is an Indian politician from Bihar and a Member of the Bihar Legislative Assembly.  Sudhakar Singh is son of RJD state president Jagdanand Singh. Singh is a graduate from Kirorimal College, Delhi University. He also runs educational institutions in Bihar.
Singh won the Ramgarh Assembly constituency on RJD ticket in the 2020 Bihar Legislative Assembly election.

References

Living people
Bihar MLAs 2020–2025
Rashtriya Janata Dal politicians
1976 births